Addison Community Schools is a Class D-sized K-12 educational facility in northwest Lenawee County, Michigan.

History
Addison Community Schools is located in Addison, Michigan. Addison Community Schools was organized in 1886 
under the direction of George Judson Tripp and marked its first official graduation exercises in 1887. Three participated in 
commencement that year, followed by one in 1888. Recently averaging 70 to 80 graduates each year, Addison's mascot is the Panther, they kept using that mascot for the 1948–49 school year. Prior to that, the school used the nickname Addison Millers, in honor of the village's 
young factory the flouring mill.

In 2012 the campus connected the new high school building and renovated elementary and middle schools. These buildings are now known as Addison Elementary School (Grades K-5), Addison Middle School (Grades 6–8), and Addison High School (Grades 9–12). As of the 2012–13 school year, the historic "Upper El.", previously the high school from 1925 to 1960 went under in 2009 to save the district money. The district superintendent is Steven Guerra. The Secondary Principal is Julie Yeider. The elementary principal position is held by Angie Huston. 
 
The school's official colors are red and black.

The school has adopted many academic and extracurricular programs through opening
local chapters of national organizations such as Key Club International and NHS. The school has also adopted a new policy that doesn't allow students to be on their phones throughout the school day.

References

External links

Public elementary schools in Michigan
Public middle schools in Michigan
Public high schools in Michigan
Schools in Lenawee County, Michigan
Educational institutions established in 1886
1886 establishments in Michigan